The Paterson Wilberforce Football Club was a U.S. soccer team which played in the National Association Football League in the early twentieth century.

History
Based out of Paterson, New Jersey, Wilberforce F.C. began as an amateur team.  In 1909, Wilberforce joined the professional National Association Football League (NAFBL).  While the first season went poorly for the team, they finished at the bottom of the standings, they quickly rose to the top three in the league the next three seasons.  In 1913, Wilberforce began the season, but withdrew after eleven games.

Year-by-year

Honors
League Championship
 Runner Up (2): 1911, 1912

External links
 Allaway, Roger West Hudson: A Cradle of American Soccer
 National Association Football League standings

Defunct soccer clubs in New Jersey
National Association Football League teams
Sports in Paterson, New Jersey